The National Union of Food Industry Workers (SINALTRAINAL) is a Colombian food industry trade union.

The group has repeatedly tried to form unions in Colombia for workers of Panamco, a Colombian Coca-Cola bottling company, and have documentation of many members or leaders being murdered, kidnapped, and tortured by right-wing paramilitary groups such as the AUC in order to prevent unionisation. They are a central focus of the ongoing Coca-Cola boycott movement  prevalent across college campuses worldwide (see criticism of Coca-Cola).

See also

Sinaltrainal v. Coca-Cola

Notes
   Amnesty International (AI) report 27 August 2003 - fear for safety of SINALTRAINAL vice-president Juan Carlos Galvis
   AI report 23 September 2005 - fear for safety of SINALTRAINAL member José Onofre Esquivel Luna

External links
 http://www.sinaltrainal.org/

Trade unions in Colombia
Food processing trade unions